Ved Kumari Ghai is a sanskrit scholar from Jammu City, Jammu and Kashmir, India. She was head of the Sanskrit department in Jammu University.

Early life 

She was born on December 16th, 1931, in Pratap Garh Mohallah, Jammu. She completed her school education in Jammu. She completed her MA in Sanskrit from Punjab University in 1953 and MA in Ancient Indian History and Culture in 1958 and PhD in Sanskrit in 1960 from Banaras Hindu University. She married Dr. Ram Pratap who is also a Sanskrit scholar.

Career 

She started her career as a professor of Sanskrit at Government College for Women, Parade, Jammu. She was a head of post graduate level Sanskrit Department, Jammu University until her retirement on 31 December 1991. She taught Panini’s Sanskrit grammar and literature at the Institute of Indian Studies, Copenhagen University, Denmark in 1966–67 and 1978–80. She is a scholar in Dogri language and also knows Hindi. She is also involved in social work. She is a member of the Amarnath shrine board.

Recognition 

 Padma Shri, the fourth highest civilian award in India, in 2010.
 Certificate of Honour by President of India for her scholarship in Sanskrit.
 Gold Medal in 1995 by Jammu and Kashmir Government for social work.
 President’s Award for Sanskrit in 1997.
 Dogra Ratan award in 2005, lifetime achievement award in 2009 and Stri Shakti Puraskara in 2010.

References 

1931 births
Living people
People from Jammu (city)
Panjab University alumni
Banaras Hindu University alumni
Recipients of the Padma Shri in literature & education
Indian Sanskrit scholars
Scholars from Jammu and Kashmir
Academic staff of the University of Jammu